The following is a list of the 78 municipalities (comuni) of the Province of Biella, Piedmont, Italy.

List

See also 
List of municipalities of Italy

References 

Biella